The 2014 Chrono des Nations was a one-day time trial held at the end of the 2014 UCI Europe Tour and cycling season. The tour has an UCI rating of 1.1. The race was won by the Frenchman Sylvain Chavanel after the winner of the previous three editions, Tony Martin, decided not to enter the race.

Results

References

External links

 

Chrono des Nations
Chrono des Nations
Chrono des Nations
Chrono des Nations